The 2012 Levene Gouldin & Thompson Tennis Challenger was a professional tennis tournament played on hard courts. It was the 19th edition of the tournament which was part of the 2012 ATP Challenger Tour. It took place in Binghamton, United States between 16 and 22 July 2012.

Singles main-draw entrants

Seeds

 1 Rankings are as of July 9, 2012.

Other entrants
The following players received wildcards into the singles main draw:
  Bjorn Fratangelo
  Robby Ginepri
  Christian Harrison
  Mitchell Krueger

The following players received entry from the qualifying draw:
  Andrew Carter
  Mitchell Frank
  Michael Venus
  Fritz Wolmarans

The following players received entry from the qualifying draw as a lucky loser:
  Maciek Sykut

Champions

Singles

 Michael Yani def.  Fritz Wolmarans, 6–4, 7–6(13–11)

Doubles

 Dudi Sela /  Harel Srugo vs.  Adrien Bossel /  Michael McClune, 6–2, 3–6, [10]

External links
Official Website